Fray Bentos Fútbol Club is a football club from Fray Bentos in Uruguay.

Established on September 12, 1905, it is the oldest football club in its city, therefore it is known as "the Doyen".

On June 13, 1912, together with the Liebig Football Club was established the Liga Departamental de Fútbol de Río Negro.

References

External links
 Fray Bentos F.B.C.

Football clubs in Uruguay
Association football clubs established in 1905
1905 establishments in Uruguay
Fray Bentos
Sport in Río Negro Department